Sernya is a site of medieval city ruins in Middle Mokshaland (modern Penza Oblast in Russia) that was razed by Mongols in 1242 battle. The city was founded c. third century AD. Total settlement area covers 14 hectares which is comparable to the cities of the Rus' principalities in 12-13th centuries. The city fortress area is 2,5 hectares (Moscow fortress 0,8-1,5 hectare appeared in 1150s).

History 
The legendary Moksha city ruins were first discovered by Russian archeologist Fedor Chekalin on 22 December, 1893, but excavations started only in 2000. Askizi (Yenisei Kyrgyz) and Volga Bulgar traders stayed in the city. The city was famous for its jewelers.

Battle of Sernya 

The city and its fortress were seized by Subutai in 1242 on return from the Mongol invasion of Europe as revenge to Mokshas that earlier joined the Mongol army. The Mokshan King Puresh and his men were fed up with fighting and suffered heavy losses during their European campaign. They planned to shift sides and had secretly discussed with Henry II the Pious that they would join Silesian army in the early morning of 9 April 1241 before the Battle of Legnica. Subutai discovered the plot and many Moksha warriors were shot dead in their sleep while they were waiting for new weapons to come inside the Mongol camp.
Defending forces used caltrops against the cavalry. Sernya's wooden walls were attacked with Chinese catapults; the Mongols used human fat for setting fire to the fortress. All defendants were killed and civilians were slaughtered during the siege. Puresh's daughter, Queen Narchat, fled with her men out of the burning fortress and headed to Noronshasht where they could hide away in Skanda caves, but they all were slain as Mongols chased them.

See also
Mongol invasion of Europe
Battle of Legnica
Queen Narchat
Burtas
Mokshas
Noronshasht

References

Notes

Sources 

 Based on British Library MS Royal 14.C.XIII Fol. 225r-236r and thus ends prematurely.

Penza Oblast
Ruins in Russia
Razed cities
Archaeological parks
Moksha people
Khazars
Medieval Russia
Defunct towns in Russia
Forts in Russia
Geography of Penza Oblast
Former populated places in Russia
Archaeological sites in Russia
Cultural heritage monuments of federal significance in Penza Oblast